John Miller-Kirkpatrick (August 1946 – December 1978) was a British computer scientist.

Works
The Scrumpi, a crude computer sold in kit form (1976).

References

1946 births
1978 deaths
British computer scientists